La Prairie may refer to:

Places
Canada
La Prairie, Quebec
La Prairie (electoral district) 
La Prairie (provincial electoral district)

United States
La Prairie, Illinois
La Prairie Township, Marshall County, Illinois
La Prairie, Minnesota
La Prairie Township, Clearwater County, Minnesota
La Prairie, Wisconsin
La Prairie Center, Illinois

Other
La Prairie (cosmetics), a brand of cosmetics manufactured by Beiersdorf